Panagiotis Ginis (born 23 January 1999) is a Greek professional footballer who plays as a goalkeeper for Super League 2 club AEK Athens B.

Honours
Ionikos
Super League Greece 2: 2020–21

References

External links

1999 births
Living people
Super League Greece players
Football League (Greece) players
AEK Athens F.C. players
Enosi Panaspropyrgiakou Doxas players
Association football goalkeepers
Footballers from Athens
Greek footballers
AEK Athens F.C. B players
Ionikos F.C. players